VACUUM is a set of normative guidance principles for achieving training and test dataset quality for structured datasets in data science and machine learning. The garbage-in, garbage out principle motivates a solution to the problem of data quality but does not offer a specific solution. Unlike the majority of the ad-hoc data quality assessment metrics often used by practitioners VACUUM specifies qualitative principles for data quality management and serves as a basis for defining more detailed quantitative metrics of data quality.

VACUUM is an acronym that stands for:

 valid
 accurate
 consistent
 uniform
 unified
 model

References

Machine learning